The Serbian League is the third level football league in Serbia. It consists of four groups, namely Belgrade, East, Vojvodina, and West. The winner of each group earns promotion to the Serbian First League.

History

1992–1995
In the summer of 1992, following the dissolution of Yugoslavia, the Serbian League became one of the two leagues (together with the Montenegrin League) that replaced the Yugoslav Third League, serving as the third level of newly formed league system in Serbia and Montenegro (then known as FR Yugoslavia). It was divided into three groups:

 Serbian League East
 Serbian League North
 Serbian League West

1995–2003
In the summer of 1995, after the initial three seasons, the league expanded from three to six groups. The Serbian League East split into the Serbian League Niš and Serbian League Timok, the Serbian League North split into the Serbian League Belgrade and Serbian League Vojvodina, while the Serbian League West split into the Serbian League Danube and Serbian League Morava. In the summer 1997, the Serbian League Kosovo was formed but lasted for only one season.

 Serbian League Belgrade
 Serbian League Danube
 Serbian League Morava
 Serbian League Niš
 Serbian League Timok
 Serbian League Vojvodina
 Serbian League Kosovo

2003–present
In the summer of 2003, the Serbian League went through a second major reorganization, when the number of groups was reduced to four. The Serbian League Niš and Serbian League Timok merged back into the Serbian League East, while the Serbian League Danube and Serbian League Morava merged back into the Serbian League West. Those two groups, East and West, previously existed from 1992 to 1995.

 Serbian League Belgrade
 Serbian League East
 Serbian League Vojvodina
 Serbian League West

Winners

1992–1995

1995–2003

2003–present

References

External links
 Football Association of Serbia
 Football Association of Belgrade
 Football Association of Vojvodina
 Football Association of Eastern Serbia
 Football Association of Western Serbia

 
3
Serbia
Professional sports leagues in Serbia